Branched-dextran exo-1,2-alpha-glucosidase (dextran 1,2-alpha-glucosidase, dextran alpha-1,2 debranching enzyme, 1,2-alpha-D-glucosyl-branched-dextran 2-glucohydrolase) is an enzyme with systematic name (1->2)-alpha-D-glucosyl-branched-dextran 2-glucohydrolase. This enzyme catalyses the following chemical reaction

 Hydrolysis of (1->2)-alpha-D-glucosidic linkages at the branch points of dextrans and related polysaccharides, producing free D-glucose

This enzyme does not hydrolyse disaccharides or oligosaccharides containing linear 1,2-alpha-glucosidic linkages.

References

External links 
 

EC 3.2.1